The surname "Gartner" is derived from the occupational name of a gardener or winemaker, and historically was primarily used by Germans, Slovenians, and Ashkenazi Jews.

People with the surname Gartner

Princess of Allemaneya Eva Maria 
Carlo Gartner
Chloe Gartner
Christian Gartner (footballer)
Daniel Gartner
Franc Gartner
Fred C. Gartner
Gideon Gartner
Hana Gartner
Hermann Treschow Gartner
Jo Gartner
Joe Gartner
John Gartner (disambiguation), several people
Mahela Gartner
Marianna Gartner
Marianne Gartner
Michael Gartner
Mike Gartner
Ray Gartner (rugby league)
Renee Gartner
Richard Gartner
Robin Gartner
Russel Gartner
Suzana Gartner
Theodor Gartner (1843-1925), Austrian linguist
William Gartner
Wolfgang Gartner
Zsuzsi Gartner

See also
 Gaertner or Gärtner
 Gardner
 Gardiner

References

Occupational surnames